Municipal socialism is a type of socialism that uses local government to further socialist aims.  It is a form of municipalism in which its explicitly socialist aims are clearly stated. In some contexts the word "municipalism" was tainted with the concept of provincialism. However when it was adopted by various socialist networks in the late nineteenth century, this approach to socialist transformation spread across Europe and North America. Following electoral success in a number of localities, by the early twentieth century discussion of municipal socialism took on a more practical character, as Edgard Milhaud, Professor of Political Economy at the University of Geneva. established Annales de la Régie Directe, an academic journal which set out to scientifically examine the initial steps towards transforming areas previously dominated by private enterprise into new forms of public service. This journal contributed to a growing network of municipal socialists in Europe and North America, in which three types of movements were united at a local level: trade unions particularly of municipally run public services such  gas, transport, sewage etc., consumer and industrial co-operatives, and other associations of consumers including tenants groups opposed to price and rent increases.

History 
There have been several historical and contemporary movements that aim to use local government to develop socialism.

In the United States 
Municipal socialism has been used to describe public ownership of streetcar lines, waterworks, and other local utilities, as was favored by "Progressives" in the United States in the late 1890s/early 1900s. The term Sewer Socialism was also used to describe the pragmatic reformist policies of Emil Seidel, Daniel Hoan and Frank Zeidler, Milwaukee's three Socialist mayors in the 20th century.

A chapter on municipal socialism appears in Class in America: an Encyclopedia:
The heyday of municipal socialism is generally considered to have been from 1901 to 1917. [...] In 1911 there were seventy-three Cities with socialist mayors, and over 1,200 other socialist elected officials across the nation.

In the United Kingdom 
The term municipal socialism has been used  to describe the local government-led social reform developed in the United Kingdom. This includes the reforms initiated by Joseph Chamberlain as mayor of Birmingham between 1873 and 1875. These reforms included rendering gas and water supplies public services, controlled by the government, clearing slums and the introduction of a city park system. Chamberlain's reforms were influential on Beatrice Webb, one of the leaders of the Fabian movement.

Beatrice Webb's husband, Sidney Webb, wrote in Socialism in England, published in the 1890s:
It is not only in matters of sanitation that this 'Municipal Socialism' is progressing. Nearly half the consumers of the Kingdom already consume gas made by themselves as citizens collectively, in 168 different localities, as many as 14 local authorities obtained the power to borrow money to engage in the gas industry in a single year. Water supply is rapidly coming to be universally a matter of public provision, no fewer than 71 separate governing bodies obtaining loans for this purpose in the year 1885-86 alone. The prevailing tendency is for the municipalities to absorb also the tramway industry, 31 localities already owning their own lines, comprising a quarter of the mileage in the Kingdom.

The Fabians were influential in the London County Council and London School Board, as well as in some other local authorities, through the newly formed Labour Party. A more radical expression of the municipal socialist movement was Poplarism in Poplar, east London, led by George Lansbury.

More recently, the term refers to the attempts in the 1980s in British cities by hard left activists in the British Labour Party to win control of local authorities and use them to develop left-wing policies on a local level, in opposition to Margaret Thatcher's right-wing Conservative central government. Examples include the Greater London Council under "Red" Ken Livingstone, Lambeth council under "Red" Ted Knight and Linda Bellos, Liverpool council under Derek Hatton and Sheffield council (sometimes referred to as "the People's Republic of South Yorkshire") under David Blunkett. These authorities were often derided as "loony left" by Conservative supporting tabloid newspapers.

Recently, municipal socialism has seen a comeback in the city of Preston, which was brought to further attention by The Economist piece on the topic. The New Statesman has also called the policies of the town "new municipalism" and "community wealth building" alongside that of municipal socialism. Both The Economist and New Statesman tie the projects to Jeremy Corbyn's leadership of the Labour Party.

In Australia
There have been several examples of municipal socialism in Australian history, a belief that was most popular in the state of Queensland. In the City of Townsville, the libertarian socialist Alderman Ned Lowry led a municipal socialist movement in the 1890s, which advocated for the "municipal ownership of gas, tram and other industries". Although Lowry died in 1897, the movement was picked up by the Townsville newspaper Democrat. In the neighbouring City of Maryborough, the municipal socialist movement advocated for the municipalisation of "water, lighting, transport, abbatoirs, markets, washhouses, and the conveyance of coffins to ".

The Communist Party of Australia held a majority of seats in the New South Wales' Kearsley Shire from 1944 to 1947. The Shire was committed to municipal socialism, advocating nationalisation of electricity and the expansion of the social wage, and was unique for its commitment to activism around federal and international affairs. The council notably rejected visits from the Governor of New South Wales, and criticised Britain for not supporting the Greek People's Liberation Army.

Critical reception by communists 
Vladimir Lenin was sharply critical of municipal socialism when the idea was taken up by Russian Mensheviks in the early twentieth century: The bourgeois intelligentsia of the West, like the English Fabians, elevate municipal socialism to a special “trend” precisely because it dreams of social peace, of class conciliation, and seeks to divert public attention away from the fundamental questions of the economic system as a whole, and of the state structure as a whole, to minor questions of local self-government. In the sphere of questions in the first category, the class antagonisms stand out most sharply; that is the sphere which, as we have shown, affects the very foundations of the class rule of the bourgeoisie. Hence it is in that sphere that the philistine, reactionary utopia of bringing about socialism piecemeal is particularly hopeless.

Subsequent leninist groups pursued this critique of municipal socialism in its 1980s incarnation. The Revolutionary Communist Group wrote:
"Municipal socialism" became an avenue that Labour used to retain the allegiance of the new labour aristocracy from the public sector. Many jobs and ‘non-jobs’ were given to this already privileged layer as the left feathered its own nest. Spurious community groups, housing schemes, race relations and ethnic minority units for tiny privileged layers of black and Irish people were set up and paid for. They were all designed to foster the interests of those who found jobs and funding through them, with little benefit to those who were really suffering the onslaught of Thatcherism. Even when "municipal socialism" took on a popular and widely supported position, its limitations were quickly exposed. The Fare's Fair dispute of 1982 showed this at an early stage, after the Law Lords overruled an attempt to introduce cheap fares on London transport, and Ken Livingstone's Greater London Council did not make a serious fight of it. In reality, Thatcher destroyed "municipal socialism" by continually restricting local democracy and the rights of local authorities to raise and spend money.

See also 
 Civic Gospel
 Libertarian municipalism
 Herbert Morrison
 Militant tendency

References

Further reading 
 Gutav Cohn "Municipal Socialism" The Economic Journal 1910
 Municipal Socialism in Europe, by G. Fiamingo The Journal of Political Economy 1898
 Sheldrake, J., Municipal Socialism, Avebury, 1989

Political terminology
Political history of the United Kingdom
History of the Labour Party (UK)
Types of socialism